The following lists the events of the 1921 Philadelphia Phillies season.

Offseason 
In 1921, the Phillies held spring training in Gainesville, Florida at Fleming Field, the home field of the Florida Gators baseball team.

Regular season

Mid-season arrests
On July 16, 1921, Phillies players Jimmy Smith, Cy Williams, Frank Bruggy, Goldie Rapp, and Cliff Lee were arrested while leaving the ballpark in Philadelphia. Smith was detained and charged with assault, however the other four were allowed to leave after talking to police. While driving away from the park, two pedestrians walked in front of Bruggy's car (which all the Phillies were riding in), and the Phillies allegedly yelled at the pair. This allegedly instigated an argument and Smith was charged with hitting one of the pedestrians several times.

Season standings

Record vs. opponents

Roster

Player stats

Batting

Starters by position 
Note: Pos = Position; G = Games played; AB = At bats; H = Hits; Avg. = Batting average; HR = Home runs; RBI = Runs batted in

Other batters 
Note: G = Games played; AB = At bats; H = Hits; Avg. = Batting average; HR = Home runs; RBI = Runs batted in

Pitching

Starting pitchers 
Note: G = Games pitched; IP = Innings pitched; W = Wins; L = Losses; ERA = Earned run average; SO = Strikeouts

Other pitchers 
Note: G = Games pitched; IP = Innings pitched; W = Wins; L = Losses; ERA = Earned run average; SO = Strikeouts

Relief pitchers 
Note: G = Games pitched; W = Wins; L = Losses; SV = Saves; ERA = Earned run average; SO = Strikeouts

References

External links 
1921 Philadelphia Phillies season at Baseball Reference

Philadelphia Phillies seasons
Philadelphia Phillies season
Philly